Artemkovskaya is a rural locality (a village) in Pakshengskoye Rural Settlement of Velsky District, Arkhangelsk Oblast, Russia. The population was 145 as of 2014.

Geography 
Artemkovskaya is located 39 km north of Velsk (the district's administrative centre) by road. Yefremkovskaya is the nearest rural locality.

References 

Rural localities in Velsky District